Iru Vallavargal is a 1966 Indian Tamil-language action thriller film, directed by K. V. Srinivasan, produced Modern Theatres and written by K. Devarajan. The film stars Jaishankar and R. S. Manohar, with L. Vijayalakshmi, S. A. Ashokan, C. Vasantha, Thangavelu and Manorama in supporting roles. It is a remake of the 1959 Hindi film Do Ustad.

Plot

Cast

Soundtrack 
Music was composed by Vedha and lyrics were written by Kannadasan.

Reception 
T. M. Ramachandran of Sport and Pastime called the film "mediocre".

References

External links 
 

1960s action thriller films
1960s spy thriller films
1960s Tamil-language films
1966 films
Films about organised crime in India
Indian action thriller films
Indian black-and-white films
Indian spy thriller films
Tamil remakes of Hindi films
Films directed by K. V. Srinivasan